Wadi al Shati, sometimes referred to as Ashati, is one of the districts of Libya in the central-west part of the country. The area is mostly desert. Wadi al Shati District is named after the depression (former lakebed) of the same name, Wadi Ashati.

To the west, Wadi al Shati borders the Illizi Province of Algeria. After the 2007 administrative reorganization of districts, it borders on Nalut in northwest, Jabal al Gharbi in the north, Jufra in the east, Sabha in the southeast, Wadi al Hayaa in the south and Ghat in the southwest.

Geography
The depression extends east from the town of Ashkeda to the town of Ideary on the west, a distance of about 140 kilometers. To the west, Wadi al Shati borders the Illizi Province of Algeria. After the 2007 administrative reorganization of districts, it borders on the following districts, namely, Nalut in northwest, Jabal al Gharbi in the north, Jufra in the east, Sabha in the southeast, Wadi al Hayaa in the south and Ghat in the southwest. The district is part of Fezzen geographical division of Libya which is mostly full of deserts. There are no perennial rivers in the region, but the region is abundant with groundwater aquifers. Around 91 per cent of the land is covered by desert, with only 8.8 per cent agricultural land (with only 1% arable lands) and 0.1 per cent of forests. The major resources found in the area is manganese. Along the coastal regions, the climate is Mediterranean, while it is desert climate in all other parts. Dust storms lasting four to eight days is pretty common during Spring. Triplotania is the northwest region, while it is Cyrenacia in the east and Fezzen in southwest.

Demographics

Per the census estimates of 2012, the total population in the region was 157,747 with 150,353 Libyans. The average size of the household in the country was 6.9, while the average household size of non-Libyans being 3.7. There were totally 22,713 households in the district, with 20,907 Libyan ones.  The population density of the district was 1.86 persons per sq. km. Per 2006 census, there were totally 31,238 economically active people in the district. There were 21,006 government employees, 2,667 employers, 9,548 first level workers and 000 second level workers. There were 7,106 workers in state administration, 2,875 in agriculture, animal husbandry and forestry, 3,048 in agriculture & hunting, 11,076 in education, 1,837 in private enterprises, 2,566 in health & social work, 1,535 in production, 9,785 in technical work and 058 service workers. The total enrollment in schools was 25,404 and the number of people above secondary stage and less than graduation was 1,274. As per the report from World Health Organization (WHO), there were no communicable disease centres, two dental clinics, one general clinics, six out-patient clinics, 29 pharmacies, 65 PHC centres, two rural clinics and no specialized clinics.

Economy
In 1943, very large, but low grade, sedimentary iron-ore deposits were discovered in the Wadi al Shatii District near Brak.  Economically, it is only suitable for strip mining. There are also potential economic manganese deposits in the same area.  The manganese occurs in lens or veinlets (up to 23% Mn) in the sandstones associated with the iron ore.

Notes

Districts of Libya
+